AnyVan is a European online marketplace for users to obtain delivery, transport, and removal services from its community of transport partners, who must bid for the work. It matches a user’s delivery route to that of a transport provider’s and connects them which, minimise costs and cut down CO2 emissions by optimising storage space and haulage. AnyVan transport partners use their own vans.

As of December 2015, AnyVan’s services are available nationwide across the UK and in other European countries such as Germany, Ireland, Spain, France, and Italy.

History
AnyVan was founded by Angus Elphinstone and Benn Goor in 2009. While running a removal business called White Van Gentleman in his hometown, Elphinstone developed an idea that he claimed could help tackle problems such as the unregulated pricing of removals and the vast production of carbon dioxide due to inefficient logistics. An online marketplace was created which Elphinstone believed would optimise capacity and minimise unused haulage and delivery space. AnyVan, as a provider, matches a consumer’s delivery route with an existing transporter partner already traveling that way.

AnyVan began its operations in the UK in 2009. In 2012, it expanded to Germany and started allowing transporters based in that country to bid for delivery jobs.

Ownership 
AnyVan is fully owned by Goorstone Holdings, a limited liability partnership whose membership comprises AnyVan's founder Angus Elphinstone and Celer Investments, a limited liability company registered in the British Virgin Islands.

Area covered
AnyVan operated exclusively in the UK between October 2009 and February 2012. In March 2012, the company expanded in Germany, opening a German website and allowing German transport providers to bid. As of December 2015, the company also operates in Ireland, Spain, France and Italy.

Awards
AnyVan.com has received awards only for its first year of operations. These were from the thegoodwebguide.co.uk website of the year award in 2010, the Green Entrepreneur Awards' Green Project of the Year 2010 and the Rushlight Award for Environmental Sustainability. It has also received a 5/5 rating from Webuser.com in 2010.

See also 
 Shiply
 uShip
 Reverse auction
 U-Haul

References

External links

Transport companies of the United Kingdom
Logistics companies of the United Kingdom